Noreen Isabel Young CM (born September 11, 1952) is a Canadian producer, puppeteer and puppet builder. She grew up in Old Ottawa South, Ontario, with her two younger brothers, John and Stephen Brathwaite, then studied drawing and painting at the Ontario College of Art and Design in Toronto.

Reading whatever she could, she learned how to build her own puppets and she became known for puppets cast with liquid latex so she could sculpt them, and the faces could move and wiggle and the mouths could open and close.

Young began her lifelong career in television puppetry at CJOH/CTV and CBOT/CBC in Ottawa, notably with Hi Diddle Day (1967–1976) (a show about a female mayor named Gertrude Diddle, in a small town called Crabgrass) and Pencil Box (1977 - 1979). The former received an Ohio State Award and the latter received ACTRA's Best Children's Programme in 1978.  She was known for building puppets for shows including Today's Special and Téléfrançais. She became an independent television producer with Noreen Young Productions Inc., which, with CBC and Telefilm Canada, produced Under the Umbrella Tree, a popular CBC Television children's series that ran from 1986 to 1993 on the CBC nationally and from 1990 to 1997 on the Disney Channel.  It was also dubbed in French for Canal Famille and currently streams on the Canada Media Fund's Encore+ on YouTube in both languages.  For that show, she was Executive Producer and performed the character "Gloria the Gopher".  

Young was also the puppeteer for "Dodie", a character on Sesame Park, the Canadian version of Sesame Street.  Her puppet characters appeared on many TVOntario productions including Readalong and Téléfrançais! and she was featured in the second Care Bears television special, 1984's The Care Bears Battle the Freeze Machine. 

Young is known for her caricature puppets of public figures such as former Governor-General Adrienne Clarkson, CBC news anchor Peter Mansbridge and hockey commentator Don Cherry, plus many prominent personalities from her hometown of Almonte, Ontario. 

In 2018, Young's puppets were featured in an exhibit "Noreen Young, a Puppet Retrospective", at the Mississippi Valley Textile Museum, in Almonte.  The 150 puppets from her collection that were exhibited spanned her career from 1967 to 2018.  They included Basil the Beagle from Hi Diddle Day (1967–1976) and 10 puppets which she created for an adult opera, "Sleeping Rough", written by composer Roddy Ellias and performed for the Ottawa music festival, "Music and Beyond" (2018).  Many of her puppets now reside in the National Museum of History and at Library and Archives Canada.

Order of Canada 
In 1995 Noreen was invested as a Member of the Order of Canada for having "effectively used puppetry to educate children on such crucial issues as safety, nutrition, environmental awareness and addictions."

References

External links
Noreen Young fonds (R16102) at Library and Archives Canada
Noreen Young at Internet Movie Database

1952 births
Canadian puppeteers
Canadian voice actresses
Members of the Order of Canada
OCAD University alumni
Living people
People from Almonte, Ontario